The Zimbabwe Women’s Resource Centre and Network (ZWRCN) is a gender and development organization established in 1990 in Harare.

The ZWRCN published the magazine WomanPlus, and in 1995 collaborated with other women's organizations to publish Zimbabwe Women's Voices.

References

Further reading

External links
 ZWRCN website

1990 establishments in Zimbabwe
Women's organisations based in Zimbabwe
Development organizations
Women's rights in Zimbabwe